The 1986 Sul America Open was a men's tennis tournament played on outdoor hard courts in Itaparica, Brazil that was part of the 1986 Nabisco Grand Prix. It was the inaugural edition of the tournament and took place from 24 November through 30 November 1986. First-seeded Andrés Gómez, who entered on a wildcard, won the singles title.

Finals

Singles
 Andrés Gómez defeated  Jean-Philippe Fleurian 4–6, 6–4, 6–4
 It was Gómez' 4th singles title of the year and the 14th of his career.

Doubles
 Chip Hooper /  Mike Leach defeated  Loïc Courteau /  Guy Forget 7–5, 6–3

References

Sul America Open
Sul America Open
Itaparica